Blue Chip Electronics, Inc., later Blue Chip International was an American computer company founded by John Rossi in 1982. Founded to develop peripherals for Commodore home computers, the company in 1986 began selling low-cost IBM PC compatibles.

1982–1986: Foundation and Commodore peripherals
Blue Chip Electronics was founded by John Rossi, an Arizona native who graduated from Arizona State University in the early 1970s. While in university, he married his high school sweetheart Rosita Rossi. After graduation, both Rosita and John Rossi spent three years in Saudi Arabia, the former landing a job teaching English to residents of villages near a gas–oil separation plant during the 1973 oil crisis. Taking an interest in international business during his stay in Saudi Arabia, John Rossi moved back to the United States in the mid-1970s to re-attend Arizona State University for a Bachelor of Global Management at Thunderbird. He graduated in 1980, and by the end of the year he had launched his career in technology working for GTE Microcircuits. John Rossi turned over to Commodore Business Machines shortly after that, moving to Europe and earning the title of sales manager for Commodore's market in that continent.

Rosita Rossi expressed exasperation with the long hours John had been working: "The company was going through great growth, and they didn't care about the families—just their business." John Rossi himself was dissatisfied with Commodore's management during the mid-1980s, when the company underwent three changes of chief executive officer (CEO), which removed its founder Jack Tramiel from office. In 1986, Rossi referred to Commodore as a "well-known revolving door". The two had considered moving to Germany, Scotland, and Hong Kong before settling in Dallas, Texas, in the United States. There, John Rossi incorporated Blue Chip Electronics as a side business in the early 1980s. By 1982, the company relocated to and formally incorporated itself in Scottsdale, Arizona, after Rosita began attending Thunderbird to earn business degree for herself. John hired another employee to help him devise the company's first products, while Rosita completed school. Although she had planned to work elsewhere, she became Blue Chips' third employee after graduating Thunderbird in 1983.

Blue Chip offered its first products in 1983 with a line of RS-232 serial and HP-IB parallel high-resolution dot-matrix printers for computers such as the Commodore 64 and the IBM PC. Later that year Blue Chip introduced a daisy wheel printer, the BCD-4015, that supports both cut-sheet and tractor-feed stationery, 5 to 15 inches wide. In 1984 the company released a lower-resolution dot-matrix printer, the M120/10, compatible only with the C64, in direct competition with Commodore's own dot-matrix printers.

By early 1986, the company had moved to Tempe. In late 1985, Blue Chip released the BCD/5.25, a direct-drive 5.25-inch floppy disk drive, directly competing against the Commodore 1541 floppy drive for the C64. The BCD/5.25 is faster than the 1541 and has a smaller footprint. When paired with the Commodore 128, the BCD/5.25 can be used in that computer's C64 compatibility mode while retaining its increase in speed, whereas Commodore's 1571 drive cannot take advantage of its own "burst" mode within the C128's C64 mode, instead emulating the earlier 1541 with its slower thoughtput.

By mid-1986, Blue Chip had moved again, to Chandler. It was now valued at US$60 million. In the same year the company planned to release the BCD/128, a competitor to the 1571, with its own burst mode, and the BCD/3.5, which would allow 3.5-inch floppy disks to be used with the C64. The BCD/3.5 was to be compatible with the 128 but without burst mode. Only the BCD/128 was released.

1986–1987: Partnership with Hyundai
In July 1986, the company announced an IBM PC compatible, the Blue Chip Personal Computer, to be released in October. Although some mail order companies were offering lower-priced systems, Blue Chip's clone was expected to be the lowest-priced system sold through retail channels. Blue Chip hired an unnamed company in Japan to design the computer and Hyundai Electronics in Korea to manufacture it. Under their contract, Blue Chip was the exclusive seller of computers manufactured by Hyundai. The partnership came into being when Blue Chip was looking for a manufacturer for its Commodore-compatible printers. When Rossi chose Hyundai as a candidate, Hyundai hinted at plans to develop its own IBM PC clone. Rossi convinced Hyundai to sell the computer under the Blue Chip name.

The Blue Chip PC has an Intel 8088 microprocessor running at 4.77 MHz, 512 KB of RAM (supporting up to 640 KB), six expansion slots, one 5.25-inch floppy drive, a high-resolution Hercules-compatible monochrome graphics card, and serial and parallel ports built into the motherboard. The base configuration originally retailed for US$699, the cheapest PC clone sold through department stores at the time, according to the Los Angeles Times. A green- or amber-phosphor monochrome monitor was sold separately for US$89. The Blue Chip PC was intended to be bundled with MS-DOS 3.2 as part of its base configuration. However, on launch, this was sold separately, along with GW-BASIC, for US$100.

Blue Chip contracted the manufacturing of 120,000 units of the computer to Hyundai in July and had several department stores on board to sell all units, including Target and Caldor. In the next month, the company chose these two stores as test markets for the computer. Rossi expected interest from the educational sector to exceed that from retail customers. However, 80% of purchases during this test run came from small- and medium-sized businesses who sought a computer at around US$700 that they could buy from stores. Blue Chip nearly doubled the number of units for Hyundai to manufacture, with Rossi expecting to sell up to 200,000 units by the next year.

On launch in October, the Blue Chip PC was stocked in over 500 department stores across the continental United States, including Target, Caldor, Sears, Venture, Federated Group, and Fedco, as well as select Walmart, Save Mart, and Toys "R" Us stores. Blue Chip supported the launch with a radio advertising campaign devised by WFC Advertising of Phoenix, Arizona. Meanwhile, Hyundai Motor Company was becoming established in the United States with its low-cost cars during the mid-1980s, and Rossi expressed interest in tying future versions of the computer with the Hyundai name.

From September to November, 27,000 units of the Blue Chip PC were sold. Hyundai projected a total of 50,000 units sold by the end of 1986 but expressed doubt that this would turn much of a profit, while remaining optimistic about sales of future versions of Hyundai's computer designs at higher prices. Blue Chip was concerned about its lack of a repair service network and skilled sales force. The company sought to rectify the latter by educating retail salespeople through seminars, training videos, and a floppy disk that demonstrated the computer's strengths. The company also hired Bryan Kerr, previously the director of marketing for the Tramiel-led Atari Corporation, as vice-president of marketing and sales in late November.

By November 1986, Blue Chip had 20 employees at its Chandler office, all of which were executives in specialist positions. That month the company introduced the Blue Chip PC AT, an AT-compatible with an Intel 80286 running at a user-switchable 8- or 10-MHz clock speed, 1 MB of RAM (expandable to 16 MB), a single 1.2 MB 5.25-inch floppy drive, an optional 40- or 80-MB hard disk drive, integrated EGA graphics, a 12-inch monochrome monitor, and keyboard. Its base configuration retailed for US$1895.

In February 1987, Hyundai bought an undisclosed minority portion of interest in Blue Chip. Blue Chip included with the PC Popular a keyboard, mouse, and other value-adds but still sold the monitor separately.

1987–1990: Breakup with Hyundai and acquisition
Roughly 50,000 Hyundai-built computers were delivered to customers by fall 1987. Despite these good sales, Blue Chip abruptly terminated its relationship with Hyundai in June 1987. Blue Chip alleged that Hyundai let an order of 9,000 original PC Turbos and 21,400 PC Populars lapse and that Hyundai was selling the computers to other dealers. Blue Chip followed up with a lawsuit, seeking  in damages, and turned to TriGem Computer, another Korean electronics company, for manufacturing. After breaking away from Blue Chip, Hyundai began selling computers under its own name in the United States, starting in September 1987.

In November that year, Blue Chip and TriGem released the Master PC 286, increasing the clock speed of the Blue Chip AT to  switchable and with eight expansion slots. This was followed up in fall 1987 with the Master PC 386, featuring an Intel 80386, as well as versions of each in the form of luggable computers. During the same period, the company introduced fax modems and a standalone "paper-white" CRT monitor.

The company established a subsidiary for international business, Blue Chip International, in 1988. By 1989, the company had grown to 30 employees, including John and Rosita Rossi, and its international subsidiary had offices in Hong Kong, Paris, and Amsterdam. Rossi blamed Blue Chip's business difficulties on dealings with thematically inappropriate retailers such as Service Merchandise and camera stores, and sought to add computer configurations available only to specialist retailers. The company released the Blue Chip 286 and Blue Chip 386, each of which features a  5.25 floppy drive and a  hard drive.

In January 1989, Capewood Limited, a holding company based in Hong Kong, expressed interest in acquiring Blue Chip Electronics and its International subsidiary for an undisclosed sum. Rossi stated that Capewood intended to continue to market Blue Chip's products while expanding its product lines into the 1990s. The deal was completed in November 1989, with Capewood acquiring 100 percent of the company. Rossi did not join the new board of directors, having pursued "other interests". The company was by this point down to 20 employees. Capewood apparently struggled with the Blue Chip name in 1990, with allegations of the company delivering faulty machines and generating bad debt among dealers. At least one dealer, Crown Computers, took legal action against Blue Chip that year. The Blue Chip trademark was declared abandoned in 1995.

See also
 Indus GT
 MSD Super Disk
 Leading Edge Model D

Citations

References

External links

1981 establishments in Texas
1982 disestablishments in Texas
1982 establishments in Arizona
1995 disestablishments in Arizona
American companies established in 1982
American companies disestablished in 1995
Commodore 64 peripheral manufacturers
Computer companies established in 1982
Computer companies disestablished in 1995
Defunct computer companies of the United States
Defunct computer hardware companies
Defunct manufacturing companies based in Arizona
Defunct manufacturing companies based in Texas